The 1988 Southern Conference men's basketball tournament took place from March 4–6, 1988 at the Asheville Civic Center in Asheville, North Carolina. The Chattanooga Mocs, led by head coach Mack McCarthy, won their fourth Southern Conference title and received the automatic berth to the 1988 NCAA tournament.

Format
The top eight finishers of the conference's nine members were eligible for the tournament. Teams were seeded based on conference winning percentage. The tournament consisted of three rounds.

Bracket

* Overtime game

See also
List of Southern Conference men's basketball champions

References

Tournament
Southern Conference men's basketball tournament
Southern Conference men's basketball tournament
Southern Conference men's basketball tournament
Basketball competitions in Asheville, North Carolina
College sports tournaments in North Carolina
College basketball in North Carolina